Ehrharta erecta is a species of grass commonly known as panic veldtgrass. The species is native to Southern Africa and Yemen. It is a documented invasive species in the United States, New Zealand, Australia, southern Europe, and China.

The species is perennial, and normally grows to about 30 to 50 centimeters, although it may reach two meters in height. It will grow in a wide variety of habitats, even in shade.

The species has been used for birdseed, and in ecological restoration such as dune stabilization. However, it has become an invasive weed in many parts of the world. Flowering and seeding throughout the year, its seeds germinate rapidly, forming new plants in only a few weeks.

Distribution
It was first recorded in Ireland in 2017, but there are earlier records from Great Britain.

References

External links 
 Grass Manual Treatment of Ehrharta erecta
 Jepson Manual Treatment — invasive plant species in California.
 USDA Plants Profile — invasive plant species in the United States.
 UC CalPhoto gallery of Ehrharta erecta

Oryzoideae
Grasses of Africa
Grasses of Asia
Afromontane flora
Taxa named by Jean-Baptiste Lamarck
Plants described in 1786